Mari Saat ( Mari Meel since 1975; born 27 September 1947 in Tallinn) is an Estonian writer.

In 1970, Saat graduated from the Tallinn Polytechnical Institute's faculty of economics.

Since 1976, she has been a member of the Estonian Writers' Union.

During the period of 1983–1993, she was a professional writer.

She is married to the artist Raul Meel.

Awards
 1974 and 1985: Friedebert Tuglas short story award

Works

 1980: novel Laanepüü. Tallinn: Eesti Raamat, 159 pp.
 1990: novel Võlu ja vaim. 1. raamat. Loomade ränded". Tallinn: Õllu, 140 pp.
 2000: novel Sinikõrguste tuultes ... Tallinn: Varrak, 117 pp.
 2008: novel Lasnamäe lunastaja. Tallinn: Tuum, 149 pp.

References

1947 births
Living people
Estonian women novelists
Estonian women short story writers
Estonian children's writers
Estonian women children's writers
20th-century Estonian women writers
21st-century Estonian women writers
Tallinn University of Technology alumni
Writers from Tallinn